Israel vs Israel is a 2010 documentary on the Israeli–Palestinian conflict by Swedish freelance journalist and filmmaker Terje Carlsson about Israeli peace activists.

The film portrays four Israelis struggling against the military occupation of the Palestinian territories: Jonathan Pollak from Anarchists Against the Wall, Yehuda Shaul from Breaking the Silence, Ronny Perlmann from Machsom Watch and Arik Ascherman from Rabbis for Human Rights.

The film won the Best International Documentary award at the 2011 Turkish Radio and Television Corporation documentary film festival as well an award from the Doha Centre for Media Freedom at the 2011 Al Jazeera Film Festival, and has been screened at festivals in Stockholm, Montreal, Tromsø, and Trondheim.

References

External links
 
 

2010 films
Documentary films about politics
Swedish independent films
Documentary films about the Israeli–Palestinian conflict
2010 documentary films
Swedish documentary films
Israeli independent films
Palestinian independent films
Israeli documentary films
Palestinian documentary films
2010s English-language films
2010s Swedish films